Clinton Vahsholtz (born March 14, 1971) is an American former stock car racing driver. He competed in the NASCAR Busch Series from 2003 to 2005.

Racing career

Stock car racing
Vahsholtz made his NASCAR debut in 2003, when he drove the No. 39 Jay Robinson Racing Ford at Las Vegas. He started the race in 31st and fell to 40th after an early engine issue. Vahsholtz then moved to his own #90 Ford for the race at Pikes Peak. He finished in 18th position despite being four laps down.

Vahsholtz had another top-20 finish in his first 2004 outing, which came at Nashville. In that race, he finished in the 19th position. JRR called upon him again at Kentucky, when he drove their No. 49 Ford to a 36th-place finish, plagued by engine problems. Vahsholtz went back to his own team in his 2004 finale at Pikes Peak. He got a career best start of 21st out of it, but crashed halfway through and finished 33rd.

Pikes Peak

Vahsholtz is known for his results and records at Pikes Peak. He has appeared at every Pikes Peak International Hill Climb since 1992. He took part in 26 events and won his division on 23 occasions, making him the most successful driver in the history of the Pikes Peak International Hill Climb. He currently holds the record for Super Stock Cars and Open Wheels. His first attempt at the peak was in 1992 in Pro Motorcycle Division.

Pikes Peak Results:

Personal life
Vahsholtz attended Woodland Park High School, where he met his high school sweetheart. He lives in Woodland Park, Colorado, where he operates his own automotive repair business.

Motorsports career results

NASCAR
(key) (Bold – Pole position awarded by qualifying time. Italics – Pole position earned by points standings or practice time. * – Most laps led.)

Busch Series

West Series

ARCA Re/Max Series
(key) (Bold – Pole position awarded by qualifying time. Italics – Pole position earned by points standings or practice time. * – Most laps led.)

References

External links
 

NASCAR drivers
People from Woodland Park, Colorado
Living people
Racing drivers from Colorado
1971 births
ARCA Menards Series drivers